Edith Gufler (born 6 August 1962 in Merano) is a former Italian sport shooter who won a silver medal in 10 metre air rifle at the 1984 Summer Olympics.

Biography
During her career, has a participation at Summer Olympics (1984) and was also Italian champion and two-time Italian record holder in the specialty.

Olympic results

See also
 Italy at the 1984 Summer Olympics

References

External links
 
 

1962 births
Living people
Italian female sport shooters
Olympic shooters of Italy
Skeet shooters
Shooters at the 1984 Summer Olympics
Olympic silver medalists for Italy
Sportspeople from Merano
Olympic medalists in shooting
Medalists at the 1984 Summer Olympics